Lowthrop is a locational surname of British origin, which originally meant a person from the village of Lowthorpe, Yorkshire. There are numerous alternative spellings of the name. The most common is Lothrop, but others include Lowthorpe, Lothorp, Lothropp, Lothroppe, Lathrop, Lathrope and Lathroppe. The name may refer to:

Damon Lathrope (born 1989), English footballer
John Lothropp (1584–1653), English priest and colonist
Philippa Lowthorpe (born 1961), English film and television director

See also
Lothrop

References

External links
Lowthorp Family Website
Lothropp Family Foundation
 A description of the village of Lowthorpe

English toponymic surnames